Pravoberezhny (masculine), Pravoberezhnaya (feminine), or Pravoberezhnoye (neuter) is the name of several rural localities in Russia:
Pravoberezhny, Orenburg Oblast, a settlement in Novocherkassky Selsoviet of Saraktashsky District of Orenburg Oblast
Pravoberezhny, Rostov Oblast, a settlement in Volochayevskoye Rural Settlement of Orlovsky District of Rostov Oblast
Pravoberezhny, Budyonnovsky District, Stavropol Krai, a settlement in Budyonnovsky District of Stavropol Krai
Pravoberezhny, Kursky District, Stavropol Krai, a settlement in Kursky District of Stavropol Krai